The 2018 Ahmad Shah Abdali 4-day Tournament was an edition of the Ahmad Shah Abdali 4-day Tournament, a cricket tournament in Afghanistan. It was the second edition of the competition to be played with first-class status. The tournament started on 1 March 2018 and finished on 12 May 2018. Six regional teams, one more than the previous tournament, competed in a round-robin format with the top two teams in the group progressing to the final. Band-e-Amir Region were the defending champions.

In the round seven fixture between Kabul Region and Boost Region, Kabul batsman Shafiqullah scored the fastest double century in first-class cricket. He scored 200 not out from 89 balls, and also scored the most sixes in a first-class match, with 24.

The final was played between Amo Region and Band-e-Amir Region. The match finished in a draw, with Band-e-Amir Region declared the winners based on a first innings lead, and therefore defending their title.

Points table

 Team qualified for the Final

Fixtures

Round 1

Round 2

Round 3

Round 4

Round 5

Round 6

Round 7

Round 8

Round 9

Round 10

Final

References

External links
 Series home at ESPN Cricinfo

Afghan domestic cricket competitions
Ahmad Shah Abdali 4-day Tournament
Ahmad Shah Abdali 4-day Tournament
Ahmad Shah Abdali 4-day Tournament
Ahmad Shah Abdali 4-day Tournament